Freedom is a 2001 Argentine drama film directed by Lisandro Alonso. It was screened in the Un Certain Regard section at the 2001 Cannes Film Festival.

Cast
 Misael Saavedra as Lumberjack
 Humberto Estrada as Foreman
 Rafael Estrada as Foreman's son
 Omar Didino as Wood buyer
 Javier Didino as Gas-station employee

References

External links

2001 films
2000s Spanish-language films
2001 drama films
Films directed by Lisandro Alonso
Argentine drama films
2000s Argentine films